Lars Arne «Lasse» Hamre (born 26 December 1944) is a Norwegian alpine skier. He was born in Trondheim. He participated at the 1968 Winter Olympics in Grenoble, where he competed in downhill and slalom.

He became Norwegian champion in slalom in 1969 and 1971, and in alpine combined in 1969.

References

External links

1944 births
Living people
Sportspeople from Trondheim
Norwegian male alpine skiers
Olympic alpine skiers of Norway
Alpine skiers at the 1968 Winter Olympics